Hanna Margareta Ardéhn (born 4 October 1995) is a Swedish actress. She is best known for her role as Maja Norberg in the first Swedish Netflix original series Quicksand, which premiered on 5 April 2019.

Biography
Ardéhn has appeared in TV productions Nio med JO, Dubbelliv, and 30 Degrees in February as well as the short film Lidingöligan which won the short story film award. She grew up in the northern suburbs of Stockholm, Sweden and at a young age she became interested in movies and acting. She started acting in a small theatre group for children when she was six years old and continued until she was 18 years old.  In 2010 she got her first film role in the movie 7X - Lika barn leka bäst. This further cemented her enthusiasm for acting, which later led to a role in the Swedish drama 30 Degrees in February.

Ardéhn graduated with a Master of Science degree in psychology from Linköping University in September 2020. She is hoping to be able to combine her psychology degree with an acting career in the future.

Career

In 2018, Ardéhn was cast in the main role of Maja Norberg on the Netflix crime drama Quicksand. The series is inspired by the novel of the same name written by Malin Persson Giolito and is the first Swedish produced original series for Netflix. The series premiered on 5 April 2019.

Filmography
2007 - Lidingöligan (film)
2008 - Nio med JO (TV)
2010 - Dubbelliv (TV - Season 1) as Amanda
2010 - 7X - Lika barn leka bäst (film) as Martina 
2012 - 30 Degrees in February (Swedish: 30 grader i februari) (TV - Season 1) as Joy
2012 - Dubbelliv (TV - Season 2)
2015 - Krigarnas Ö (film) as Nicke
2015 - 30 Degrees in February (TV - Season 2) as Joy
2019 - Quicksand (Netflix Series) as Maja Norberg

References

External links
 IMDB: Hanna Ardéhn
 Swedish Film Database: Hanna Ardéhn
 Agent: McLean-Williams
 Agent: Agentfirman

1995 births
Living people
People from Österåker Municipality
Swedish actresses